The Luba people of the Democratic Republic of the Congo have a twelve-month calendar which is thought to begin in September. Each month is named for natural occurrences and human activity appropriate to that time.

Months

 Mvul'a Mbedi (September) - "first rains", the beginning of the rainy season
 Kibitenda (October) - "white ants come out"
 Kaswa Bitenda (November) - "the little insects that can be seen here and there", brown ants come out of their mounds
 Tshiswe Munene (December) - "numerous brown ants"
 Tshiongo Wa Minanga (January) - "month of drought"
 Luishi (February) - "planting season" (corn)
 Lumungulu (March) - "planting season"
 Luabanya Nkasu (April) - "hoe distributor", a weeding month
 Tshisanga Nkasu (May) - "hoe assembling", the dry season, no planting goes on
 Kashipu Nkenza (June) - "first cold, dry air, then hot."
 Tshibungu Mulume (July) - "the cloudy month with a strong cloud"
 Tshibungu Mukaji (August) - "the cloudy month with a weak cloud"

References

Specific calendars
Luba